Jürgen Mansberger (born January 13, 1989) is an Austrian former professional association football player.

References

1989 births
Living people
Austrian footballers
Association football midfielders
SV Mattersburg players
Austrian Football Bundesliga players